The list of ship launches in 2006 includes a chronological list of ships launched in 2006.


References

See also 

2006
Ship launches